Harper Adams University, founded in 1901 as Harper Adams College, is a public university located close to the village of Edgmond, near Newport, in Shropshire, England. Established in 1901, the college is a specialist provider of higher education for the agricultural and rural sector. It gained university college status in 1998, and university status in 2012 when the requirements were relaxed.

The university provides more than 50 foundation, undergraduate and postgraduate degree programmes to students from over 30 countries. The university is set within a 550 hectare (1360 acre) working farm.

History 
Harper Adams College, which would become the university, was founded in 1901. Its first Principal was Headworth Foulkes (1901–1922). Thomas Harper Adams, a wealthy Shropshire gentleman farmer, died in 1892, bequeathing the estate which was the original foundation. The college had just six students to begin with.

In 1909 a specialist poultry husbandry was created.

During the First World War, Harper Adams remained open, and in 1915 the first women were admitted into the college on wartime farm courses. Harper Adams was the first institute to do so, and in 1916 women were admitted as full-time students onto a wide variety of courses. Approximately, 200 staff and former students served during the war and 40 are known to have died as a result. In 2015, 10 additional names were added to the university's memorial board, after previously unrecorded alumni were also discovered to been killed in action. A board in the Old Library listing the names of those killed was dedicated in March 2015, crafted by Peter Nunn of the university's estate department, whilst a new memorial garden was also created outside the library.

The agricultural depression of the 1920s onward led to a drop in student numbers. In 1922, Charles Crowther (1922–1944) became Principal and efforts were taken to ensure the College stayed open. The National Institute of Poultry Husbandry opened in 1926, bringing with it to Harper a high profile in areas of teaching and research. The college managed to stay open during the Second World War, and in 1939 the first girls arrived at the college. Bill Price (1946–1962) become Principal in 1946 and student numbers steadily rose to 222. The Jubilee Hostel was opened in 1951.

Reginald Kenny became principal in 1962 until 1977. In 1964, the funding of the college was passed from the Ministry of Agriculture to the Department of Education and Science. The first Higher National Diploma students were enrolled in 1969. Tony Harris was later appointed principal in 1977 until 1994. Degree courses were first introduced at Harper Adams in 1981. The university was one of the first institutions to introduce a BSc. sandwich course. The CNAA granted Harper Adams the authority to validate its own courses. In 1985, the science building was opened by The Princess Margaret. 

Student numbers passed 1000 for the first time in 1991. In 1994, three new student residences were opened. Wynn Jones became principal in 1996, and later that year the Privy Council granted the university degree awarding powers. In 1998, Harper Adams gained the title of University College. In 2004, Harper Adams was awarded £2.1 million in funding to develop its work with rural businesses. Harper Adams gained the power to award research degrees in 2006 and shortly after, a new Biomass Hall was opened. Dr David Llewellyn was appointed principal in 2009. In the September, a new £2.3 million dairy unit was opened and in December, a £3million award-winning Regional Food Academy (RFA) was officially opened by The Princess Royal. In 2010, Nick Herbert opened a Postgraduate and Professional Development Centre, and in the same year the Faccenda student centre and a new student hall of residence were opened. An anaerobic digester opened in 2011, expects to offset the carbon emissions of the university three times over annually. It won a Renewable Energy Infrastructure Award and hosts an award-winning anaerobic digestion facility. Mr Ken Sloan was appointed Vice-Chancellor of Harper Adams University in 2021, its eighth institutional leader.   

Harper Adams is a lead academic sponsor of the JCB Academy which opened in 2010. JCB Academy was the first university technical college to be established in England.

In 2012, Harper Adams had the title 'university' conferred upon it. This ended the institution's long history of being a college and consequently, Harper Adams became Shropshire's first university.

In 2020, the University welcomed the first student intake to a new joint veterinary school with Keele University.

Campus 
The campus is on farm land on the outskirts of Edgmond near Newport, Shropshire.  Over the last decade more than £45 million has been invested in the campus. Harper Adams operates a 635 hectare (1569 acres) commercial farm on campus. Undergraduate students live on campus in one of 15 halls.

Organisation

Academic departments
Undergraduate courses are offered via 5 academic departments and courses fall under 6 broad subject areas

 Agriculture
 Animal health, welfare and behaviour sciences (including veterinary professions)
 Business and Agri-Food Management and Marketing
 Land, Property and Environmental Management
 Land Based Engineering
 Food Science, Technology and Innovation

Academics

Research 
In 2014 Harper Adams University has been recognised for the quality of its research by the Research Excellence Framework.

Areas of research include; management of soil and water, crop disease resistance, agricultural technology, livestock carbon footprint reduction, genetic approaches to improving food quality, bioenergy and renewable sources, agricultural landscape biodiversity, pedagogy and animal welfare.

Research facilities

Facilities for the university's research work include:
 Elizabeth Creak Building
 Princess Margaret Science Laboratories
 Jean Jackson Entomology Building
 Crop and Environment Research Centre
 Dairy Crest Innovation Centre
 Poultry Research Unit
 Regional Food Academy

Hands Free Hectare 
Since 2016 the "Hands Free Hectare" project within the engineering department has been developing robotic farming operations.

Ranking & Awards

Awards 
The Queen's Anniversary Prizes for Further and Higher Education, winner of Innovative applications in agricultural engineering and technologies to address UK and global food security, 2017.

Rankings

Sunday Times 
 UK University of the Year, runner up 2020
 Top 20 Universities, (ranked 17th) 2019,
 Best Modern University, 2017 and 2019
 Top 50 UK Universities 2011.
 Best University College (The Sunday Times): 2008, 2009. 2010, 2011, 2012

Times Higher Education 

 UK's Best Modern University (Times Higher Education), 2017.
 1st Student Experience (Times Higher Education), 2017

Employment 
The 2020 Graduate Outcomes survey showed 98.8% were in work or further study 15 months after completing their studies.

Sports
 
Harper Adams has a variety of sports clubs, including rugby, shooting, football, hockey, fencing, netball, polo, tug of war,  basketball, motorsport, off-roading, rowing, running, field sports, equestrian and mountain biking. The university competes in the British Universities and Colleges Sport leagues and championships.

Rowing 
Harper Adams University Boat Club (HAURC) is located at Pengwern Boat Club on the River Severn in Shrewsbury. Members compete in the BUCS Rowing League, local regattas. The club's registered blades are dark blue, cyan and gold.

Shooting 
Harper Adams University Clay Shooting Club (HAUSC) is the largest club in the university with over 100 members. The club competes in local competitions, BUCS League, the Countryside Alliance Cirencester Cup Competition and also holds private matches against the Royal Agricultural University and St Andrews University. The HAUSC is consistently placed amongst the most successful shooting clubs in the UK. In 2011 and 2012, the HAUSC won the national title at the BUCS Clay Pigeon Shooting Championships.

Motorsport 
The Motorsport Team has its own VW Golf GTi rally car and Ford Fiesta R2 National. In January 2017, the team announced a partnership with the M-Sport World Rally Team. The team regularly competes in BRC events.

Coat of arms and flag 

The arms of the university are those of the Harper Adams family, which were formally transferred to the university by letters patent presented in May 2018 Rouge Croix Pursuivant, of the College of Arms in May 2018.  As a banner of arms these are in use as the university flag.

The arms appear in stained glass in the main building.

Governance

Chancellor 
The Chancellor has been  
HRH The Princess Royal, from its opening in 2013 until the present. This is a ceremonial role.

List of College Principals and University Vice-Chancellors
 Hedworth Foulkes (1901–1922)
 Charles Crowther (1922–1944)
 Bill Price (1946–1962)
 Reginald Kenney (1962–1977)
 Tony Harris (1977–1994)
 Wynne Jones (1996–2009)
David Llewelyn (2009–2021): the role was renamed Vice-Chancellor on full university status being conferred in 2012.
Ken Sloan (2021–present)

Notable people

Notable alumni
 Scott Bemand (born 1978) a retired English rugby union player.
 Christopher Borrett (born 1979) an English cricketer.
 Helen Browning OBE (born 1961) an organic livestock and arable farmer in Wiltshire
 Robin Faccenda (born 1937) wealthy businessman in the poultry industry
 Rachael Hamilton (born 1970) a British politician, MSP for Ettrick, Roxburgh and Berwickshire.
 Jorian Jenks (1899–1963) an English farmer, environmentalism pioneer and fascist.
 Michael Paget-Wilkes (born 1941) Archdeacon of Warwick 1990–2009.
 Boyd Rankin (born 1984) an Irish cricketer.
 Rob Strachan (born 1960) the heir presumptive to the Mill of Strachan
 Julian Sturdy (born 1971) a farmer and MP for York Outer.
 Barbara Woodhouse (1910–1988) a dog trainer, author, horse trainer and TV personality.

Notable governors
 Sir Arthur Colegate, Governor and Conservative party MP
 Francis Fitzherbert, 15th Baron Stafford DL, Landowner, Peer

Honorary degree and fellowship holders

 Adam Henson
 Richard Scott, 10th Duke of Buccleuch and 12th Duke of Queensbury
 Dame Julia Slingo
 Hugh Pennington
 Jimmy Doherty
 Sir Anthony Bamford DL, Chairman of JCB
 Baroness Hazel Byford DBE, Conservative bench and Shadow Minister
 Peter Kendall, NFU President
 Gerald Grosvenor, 6th Duke of Westminster
 Sir John Beddington
 Catherine Henstridge
 Justin King CBE, Chief Executive of J Sainsbury PLC
 Geoffrey Davies OBE, Managing Director of Alamo Group Europe Ltd
 The Princess Royal

Notable staff
 Charles Crowther (1876–1964), Principal of Harper Adams Agricultural College from 1922 to 1944, father of Geoffrey Crowther, Baron Crowther
 F. P. Raynham (1893–1954) In 1909 he was an office worker at the Harper Adams Agricultural College, he then became a British pilot from the early days of aviation
 William Thomas Price, CBE, MC, Principal, Harper Adams Agricultural College, CBE in 1960 New Year Honours
 Anthony George Harris, OBE, Principal, Harper Adams Agricultural College, OBE in 1991 Birthday Honours
 Izzy Warren-Smith, Senior Lecturer, Rural Economics and Management, Harper Adams University College (for services to the rural economy) Midlander of the Year 2003
 Elphin Wynne Jones, OBE, Principal, Harper Adams University College, OBE in 2009 New Year Honours
 David Llewellyn (born 1960) Vice-Chancellor of Harper Adams University since 2009
 Simon Leather, Professor of Entomology at Harper Adams University, aphid specialist

In popular culture
Ruth Archer, a fictional character played by English actress Felicity Finch from the BBC Radio 4 soap opera The Archers, attended Harper Adams University College as part of her fictional backstory.

References

External links
 Harper Adams University homepage
 Harper Adams University Students' Union homepage

 
Agricultural universities and colleges in the United Kingdom
Buildings and structures in Newport, Shropshire
Telford and Wrekin
Education in Shropshire
Educational institutions established in 1901
1901 establishments in England